Hyam is a regionally important linguistic cluster of Plateau languages in Nigeria. Hyam of Nok is the prestige dialect (Blench 2008). Writing the sociolinguistics of Hyam, Blench treats Sait, and Dzar as distinct varieties, and notes that Yat and Ankung may be viewed as separate languages, however, Hayab (2016) presents a differing opinion arguing that it is Ankung, a language called Iduya, that is not mutually intelligible to Hyam. Meanwhile, Hyam, which is spoken by the Ham people of Nigeria, popularly known as 'Jaba' in a recent study by Philip Hayab, a native of the area and a linguist who carried out in-depth research into the language, reveals that 'Jaba' has a Hausa etymology and is derogatory and should be discarded (John 2017).

Distribution

Native Hyam speakers are found mainly in Jaba, Kachia and Kagarko. They are also found in Jema'a Local Government Areas of southern Kaduna State and in Keffi Local Government Area of Nasarawa State of Nigeria.

Dialects

James (1998) classified the Hyam dialects according to the following sub-groups he placed under the Ham or Northern Group of the Proto-Plateau Ethno-Linguistic Cluster:
 Ham Kpop (Jaban Kwoi)
 Ham Ngat Ham (Jaban Katari)
 Ham Shambang (Samban)
 Ham Duhyah (or Idun) (Jaban Lungu)
 Ham Kworri (Chori)
 Ham Det (Faik/Kenyi)
 Ham Netkun/Netwho (Gbaham)
 Ham Nyakpah (or Nyankpa) (Yeskwa)
 Ham Kong/Rhuini (Kamantan)

According to Hayab (2016:5-11), however, the Ham people, aside migratory past, a subject requiring keen study, could be said to speak the following:
 Hyam Taa Ham - 'Hyam spread in Ham area' including Nok, Ghikyaar, Kuscum, Har Dzyee, Shong, etc.
 Kwyeny - same as James's Hyam Kpop (spoken in Har Kwain or Kwoi)
 Kyoli - the dialect of the Kworri/Kwori (also known as Chori)
 Saik
 Shamang - same as Shambang
Hayab (2016:6) added that other varieties may also include:
 Dùya/Idúyà - same as Idun
 Gwora - Gora
 Yat
 Zhire - Kenyi.

Further more, Hayab (2016:8) classified these dialects into four clusters, A-D, according to their levels of intelligibility.
Cluster A. Hyam Taa, Kwyeny, and Saik (all have not less than 90% phonological homogeneity in vocabulary
Cluster B. Kyoli and Shamang (have about 50% intelligibility)
Cluster C. Yat and Zhire (may be coherent with A and B. More studies needed)
Cluster D. Idúyà [or Idun ] and Gwora (stand in an independent category)

Again note that Hyam is the language spoken by the Ham people.

Blench (2019) lists:

Kwyeny
Yaat
Saik
Dzar
Hyam of Nok

Phonology
The Hyam Literacy Committee identifies the following 41/42 basic symbols in its orthography.

a   a̱   b   c  d   dz   e   e̱   f   g   gb   gh   h   hw   hyw   i   i̱   j   k   kh   kp   l   m   n   ng   ny   o   p   r   s   sh   t   th   thn   ts   u   v   w   y   yw   z   zh

Vowels (Vawel)
Monophthongs
Short Vowels (Vawella̱ Sha̱kuup)

a a̱ e e̱ i i̱ o u

Long Vowels (Vawella̱ Sha̱ceri)

aa ee ii oo uu

Diphthongs (Khwikhwir Vawel)

ai au a̱u ou

Consonants (Konsonan)
b c d dh dz f g gy gb gh ghy h hw hwy hyw j k ky kh khy kp l m n nh ng ny p r s sh t th thn ts v w y yw z zh

Numerals
Hayab (2016:66) pinpoints, stating that "available data in Hyam by Koelle (1854: appendix, 2-188) and Meek (1931:120) reveals that the Ham contest in virtually a dissimilar way from what is obtained today." He added that it is apparent that the old counting system has been replaced with a Hausa styled one, and again states that "at present, the old style with ten (which was kop) now as ' shwak '. A case points is kop (ten) shows to be an incomplete number observing the evidence that ' mbwan shwak ' (11) suggests that we were a number away from shwak (twelve)." He then added that "this is because the word ' mbwan ' actually denotes bwat - short of or 'remaining'.

The above can be said to be true, considering the case of Tyap, a related language, where the present word for ten is swak, while the word "kop/kwop" is almost extinct, just as in Hyam, and only used for counting in thousands. The word "thousand" in Tyap is cyi kop/kwop, meaning (considering the old usage of the word kop/kwop), "a hundred - ten times" or "100 X 10".

These, according to Hayab (2016:66-67) are the numbers used at least 200 years ago for counting in Hyam.

Lexicon
The following is an abridged lexicon via the Hyam wordlist by Roger Blench.

References

Further reading
 Blench (2008) Prospecting proto-Plateau. Manuscript.
 
 
 John, P. H. (2017). Narratives of identity and sociocultural worldview in song texts of the Ham of Nigeria: a discourse analysis investigation. PhD Dissertation submitted to the University of Stellenbosch, Unpublished

External links
 Narratives of identity and sociocultural worldview in song texts of the Ham of Nigeria: A discourse analysis investigation
 Roger Blench: Hyamic page

Central Plateau languages
Languages of Nigeria